Arif Aiman bin Mohd Hanapi (born 4 May 2002) is a Malaysian professional footballer who plays as a forward or winger for K League 1 club FC Seoul and the Malaysia national team.

Aiman began his senior club with Johor Darul Takzim after playing for the youth club few years back. In 2021, he won the Most Valuable Player (MVP) in the 2021 National Football Awards ceremony and create the nation's history after become the youngest player (19 years old) ever chosen as MVP, surpassing teammate Safawi Rasid, who was 21 when he was selected as MVP in 2018. He was also named Best Striker and Most Promising Player in that year’s awards.

Club career

Youth career

Arif Aiman's talent was discovered during the Mykids programme in 2011/12, and he later joined the squad that won IberCup Costa Del Sol in 2015. He then decided to leave AMD at the end of 2018 to join JDT Academy in order to increase his playing opportunities. After playing for JDT in the Youth and President's Cups, he caught the attention of Malaysia U18 squad coach, Bojan Hodak, in early 2019.

Arif Aiman is a product of the National Football Development Programme of Malaysia (NFDP) from 2015 to 2017 and then Johor Darul Ta'zim Academy. He played in all levels of the academy including JDT IV, JDT III, JDT II until he became a regular for the first team.

Johor Darul Ta'zim

2020 season
Arif Aiman made his senior debut with Johor Darul Ta'zim II on 29 February 2020 in the 2020 Malaysia Premier League. He played 73 minutes in a 3-1 away win against Negeri Sembilan. On 14 March 2020, he made his debut with the first team against Felda United in the Malaysia Super League. He scored his first goal for the club against Kuching City F.C. in a 1-0 win in the Malaysia Cup.

2021 season
Arif made his first appearances in the 2021 season against UiTM after his fellow teammate Safawi Rasid was subbed off because of a knee injury. He also scored in that match. Arif was named in the 25 best ASEAN wonderkids in football. On 22 June 2021, he made his debut in AFC Champions League in a 0-1 loss against Japanese club Nagoya Grampus.

International career
Arif made his first appearance for Malaysia in an unofficial friendly match against Kuwait on 23 May 2021 at the age of 19 years 19 days. His official debut is against Bahrain on 29 May 2021. His first competitive match with Malaysia is against Vietnam in a 2022 World Cup Qualifier as a substitution in the 61st minute and end up losing 1-2.

Career statistics

Club

Notes

International

Honours
Johor Darul Ta'zim
 Malaysia Super League: 2021, 2022
 Malaysia FA Cup: 2022
Malaysia Cup: 2022
 Malaysia Charity Shield: 2021, 2022

Individual

 Most Valuable Player (MVP) – Malaysia National Football Awards: 2021, 2022
 Best Striker Awards – Malaysia National Football Awards: 2021, 2022
 Best Young Player – Malaysia National Football Awards: 2021, 2022

References

2002 births
Living people
People from Pahang
Malaysian footballers
Malaysia international footballers
Malaysia Super League players
Johor Darul Ta'zim F.C. players
Association football forwards